Terrance Bernard Shaw (born January 11, 1973) is an American football cornerback. He was born in Marshall, Texas.

High school years
Shaw attended Marshall High School in Marshall, Texas and was a letterman in football. In football, as a senior he was a first-team All-District selection and a first-team All-Region selection, and led his team to a Texas High School Football State Title.

College years
Shaw attended Stephen F. Austin State University and was a Business major and a four-year letterman in football. In football, as a senior, he was a first-team Division I-AA All-American and a first-team All-Southland Conference selection. As a junior, he garnered 67 tackles and was an All-Conference Honorable Mention selection. As a sophomore, he started the first five games, before tearing the anterior cruciate ligament in his right knee.

Shaw is a member of Phi Beta Sigma fraternity.  He became a member while his time at Stephen F. Austin State University.

Professional career 
Shaw was selected in the second round of the 1995 NFL Draft by the San Diego Chargers. During his career he played as a cornerback for the San Diego Chargers, Miami Dolphins, Minnesota Vikings, New England Patriots, and Oakland Raiders in the United States National Football League (NFL). On February 3, 2002 in the Louisiana Superdome in New Orleans, Louisiana before a packed house of almost 73,000, Shaw helped the Patriots beat the St. Louis Rams in Super Bowl XXXVI in 2001. Shaw also played in Super Bowl XXXVII with the Oakland Raiders in 2002. In 2000, Shaw was a part of the Miami Dolphins secondary was ranked #1 in the NFL and that secondary led the league with 25 picks. Shaw had six playoff appearances in a ten-year career.

Personal life 
He is married to Shawneeque Watkins Shaw and they have nine children - a daughter Ashley and sons Terrance Jr., Teris, Thomas, Trysten, Tierney, Trinity, Tylend, and daughter Timberlynd.

He coaches his sons youth league select football team, the SGP Rams.

Notes

1973 births
Living people
People from Marshall, Texas
American football cornerbacks
Stephen F. Austin Lumberjacks football players
San Diego Chargers players
Miami Dolphins players
Minnesota Vikings players
New England Patriots players
Oakland Raiders players